The fan-tailed gerygone (Gerygone flavolateralis) is a species of bird in the family Acanthizidae. It is found in New Caledonia and Vanuatu. The Rennell gerygone (G. citrina) of the Solomon Islands was formerly considered conspecific, but was split as a distinct species by the IOC in 2021.

References

fan-tailed gerygone
Birds of New Caledonia
Birds of Vanuatu
fan-tailed gerygone
fan-tailed gerygone
Taxonomy articles created by Polbot